Sjaron Minailo is a Dutch Israeli opera director. He is the founder of Studio Minailo, an Amsterdam based studio for experimental opera, working throughout Europe in opera houses such as La Monnaie, Dutch National Opera, Bergen National Opera and Opera Poznan.

Early life 
Minailo was born in 1979 in Arad, Israel to Soviet Union immigrants. During his schooling in the Thelma Yelin High School for the Arts, he received initial training as an actor. After completing his graduation, Minailo joined the University of Amsterdam for BA and MA in Theatre Studies. During his time at the University, he created a theatre group with co-students to work on the musical theatre before switching to opera.

Career in opera 
After graduating, Minailo started working as a freelance director and was a director in residence for four years at the Dutch Chamber Opera House from 2008 to 2012. During that period and after, he has directed several music-theatre and opera production in commission or through his own studio. In 2016, he received a nomination in the Young Director category at 2016 International Opera Awards. In 2021 Minailo was appointed as Artist-Curator at the Opera Forward Festival of the Dutch National Opera where he is responsible for the OFF Labs.

Teaching career 
Minailo works as a design master at Sandberg Institute, Amsterdam and a tutor at University of Underground. He also work as a coach for young talents at Opera Forward Festival at the Dutch National Opera and Akademie voor Dans en Theater.

From 2022 to 2024 Minailo led a temporary programme at the Sandberg Institute, titled Re:master Opera.

Works
Minailo's opera productions have included:

 Khadish, Israel, Germany, England and Belgium 2006
 Khadish I Erwartung, 2007
 A Prayer of The Heart, 2008
 Erwartung / Maeterlinck Lieder, 2008
 Elektra, 2009
 La Femme Humaine, 2009
 Gesprekken van de Ziel, 2009
 Exiles, 2009
 Elektra / Erwartung, 2010
 Amygdala, 2010
 De Cornet, 2010
 Saviour Sound, 2010
 A Stranger to Myself, 2010
 Container, 2011
 The Artist is Also Present, 2011
 Persona, based on the film by Ingmar Bergman 2011
 Dead class: Requiem, 2011
 Soul Seek (Internet Opera), 2012
 Traagheid, 2012
 The City Wears A Slouch Hat, 2012
 Nikola, 2012
 Pornographia, 2012
 Desired Constellations, 2013
 In Croce, 2013
 Victory Over The Sun, 2013
 Rothko Chapel, Morton Feldman, 2013
 Rothko Chapel Locations #2, 2014
 Alice, 2014
 Stars Like Sibilants Speak (music video), 2014
 Megalomania, 2014
 Mijn Liefste (music video), 2014
 Medulla, based on the album by Björk, 2015
 Semele, Händel, 2015
 Three Voices For Joan La Barbara, Morton Feldman 2015
 To Be Sung, Pascal Dusapin, 2016
 The Transmigration Of Morton F. (interactive Internet Opera), 2016
 In A Landscape, 2016
 Arariboy, 2016
 Before Present, 2016
 Tell Tale Heart, 2016
 Nachtschade: Aubergine, 2017
 Die Zauberflöte, Mozart 2017
 Tudo Aquilo Que Mais Eu Temia Desabou Sobre Minha Cabeça, 2017
 Soft Forces (music video), 2018
 Future Opera, 2018
 Commuter (music video), 2018
 Hippolyte et Aricie, Jean-Philippe Rameau 2019
 Il Diluvio Universale, Michelangelo Falvetti, 2019
 Little Girl (music video), 2019
 Retrotopia, 2019
 Intimate Letters, 2020
 Undine (Animation Opera), 2020/2021
 Eva - Spoken opera podcast, based on the book by Carry van Bruggen, 2021
 Korke & Gege, 2021
 Holle Haven, 2021
 The Arrival of Mr. Z, 2021. Composition by Meriç Artaç
 Notwehr, 2022. Composition by Annelies van Parys to Libretto by Gaea Schoeters. Commissioned by the Venice Biennale

References

External links
Studio Minailo

The Transmigration of Morton F. - Interactive Opera
Soul Seek - Internet Opera
Eva - Gesproken Opera Podcast

Year of birth missing (living people)
Living people
Dutch opera directors
Dutch people of Soviet descent
Israeli people of Soviet descent
People from Arad, Israel
University of Amsterdam alumni